Arve Eilif Furset (born 5 December 1964 in Askvoll, Western Norway) is a Norwegian composer, jazz musician (piano, keyboards) and music producer, known from a series of record releases and cooperations with the likes of Ernst-Wiggo Sandbakk, Kjersti Stubø, Elin Rosseland, Johannes Eick, Vigleik Storaas, Jostein Hasselgård, Eivind Aarset, and Norma Winstone.

Career 
Furset studied music at Trondheim Musikkonservatorium (1983–85), and was a member of bands like the Bodega Band (1985–89), Saz Semai (1986–87), and Ernst-Wiggo Sandbakk & The Sympathy Orchestra (1989–90). He also worked regularly with bands like the quintet First Set, with whom he performed at festivals in Lillehammer, Vossajazz and Moldejazz, the trio Konerne ved Vandposten and Orleysa. Since 1999, he toured with Eivind Aarset's band Électronique Noire. In the late 1990s he also worked with pop musicians like the band Flava to da bone and Lynni Treekrem.

Furset was orchestra leader and composer of Trøndelag Teater and participated in more than thirty of the ensembles tours. Later he worked at the Sentralteateret and in Oslo Nye Teater and worked as a composer, arranger and composer for the big Saturday night shows on NRK1.
He now works as a music producer in the field of dance music, World Music and electropop, and teaches keyboards and electronical music at the "Nordisk Institutt for Scene og Studio" (NISS). He composed and produced two songs for the Norwegian Eurovision Song Contest, and the title I'm Not Afraid To Move On, sung by Jostein Hasselgård was the winner in the Norwegian finale, and 4th in the international finale.

Entries in the Eurovision Song Contest
"I'm Not Afraid To Move On" by Jostein Hasselgård, Norway (Eurovision Song Contest 2003), 4th place

Entries in national Eurovision pre-selections
"Good Evening, Europe!" by Birgitte Einarsen (Norway 2003), 3rd place
"Velvet Blue" by Kathrine Strugstad (Norway 2005)

Discography 
Within Orleysa
1991: Orleysa (Odin Records)
1993: Svanshornet (Odin Records)

Other projects
1987: Bodega Band Vol. IV
1992: Going, with First Set
1992: Far to go, with Fair Play & Norma Winstone
1998: Sympathetic, with Ernst-Wiggo Sandbakk & The Sympathy Orchestra
2001: Light Extracts (Jazzland Records), within Eivind Aarset's Électronique Noire
2001: Oofotr II Heilo catalog on Grappa Music, featured by Oofotr

References 

20th-century Norwegian pianists
21st-century Norwegian pianists
20th-century Norwegian composers
21st-century Norwegian composers
Norwegian jazz pianists
Musicians from Askvoll
Living people
1964 births